Jones, officially the Municipality of Jones, is a 1st class municipality in the province of Isabela, Philippines. According to the 2020 census, it has a population of 45,628 people.

It is one of only two towns in the Philippines named after William Atkinson Jones who authored the Philippine Autonomy Act of 1916, the other being Banton, Romblon, which was renamed Jones in 1918 but reverted to its original name in 1959.

Etymology
Named in honor of William Atkinson Jones, an American legislator.

History

The southern portion of Echague separated by Cagayan River was created into a municipality named Jones in honor of an American Legislator, William Atkinson Jones, who authored the Philippine Autonomy Act of 1916, and was inaugurated on January 1, 1921.  It was originally composed of 21 barrios of virgin forests and wide fertile plains with Cabanuangan as the seat of the municipal government.

The house of one Tirso Mateo served as the first town hall, with the following as the first municipal officials: President - Don Antonio Vallejo; Vice President - Benito Tiburcio; Secretary - Francisco Gumpal; Treasurer - Pio Tomines; Justice of Peace - Daniel Apostol; Chief of Police - Zoilo Gadingan; and Modesto Payuyo, Antonio Pintang, Gregorio Santos, Dionicio Cristobal, Valentin Torio, and Damaso Leano as councilors.

The first proposed townsite of Jones was in barrio Daligan, but due to the insistence of the municipal president Don Antonio Vallejo who voluntarily donated two hectares of land for the municipal hall and public market site, he also later donated the vast fertile land area of Jones Rural School and Jones North Central School.

Transportation was then a big problem as there were no good roads, the barrios being connected only by narrow roads and trails suited for hiking, for horses and carabaos, and for sleds and carts.  During rainy days, these roads and trails easily turned into knee-deep mud fit only for wallowing carabaos.  The principal means of transportation was the Cagayan River passing through almost all the barrios, using raft and boats.  It was only after decades that motor vehicles began to ply between Jones and nearby Echague.

The vast virgin forests and fertile soil of the place were populated and harnessed and cultivated by the indigenous Pugots [Aetas] and Ilongots [Bugkalots], and the Yogads who are natives of southern Isabela, particularly the towns of Echague, Angadanan and San Guillermo, and the enterprising Ilocanos who migrated overland for a couple of centuries all the way from the Ilocos region in northwestern Luzon.  Other ethnic groups followed like the Gaddangs, Ifugaos and Ibanags, and later, the Tagalogs from Central Luzon.

The Aglipayan Church (Philippine Independent Catholic Church) was the first established church in the area, followed later by the Roman Catholic Church and various Protestant denominations.  There were very few primary schools, all hinged to an intermediate school called Jones Farm School at the poblacion.  The early inhabitants concentrated on agriculture with tobacco, corn and peanuts as primary crops.  Revenue principally came from the real property tax, cedula tax and sled tax.  The town was then greatly dependent on national aid.

The town holds a special place in the history of Isabela.  When the Japanese Imperial Army invaded the Philippines in 1941, Jones became a shelter for the national and provincial officials and for evacuees from other places until 1942.

The town likewise became the provincial seat of the provincial government during the wartorn years from 1941 to 1943.  It was subsequently occupied by the Japanese forces, but its forested areas continued to be a stronghold of Filipino guerillas and American soldiers who for a while were under the command of the Brigadier General Guillermo Nakar.

In 1945, Filipino troops of the 2nd USAFFE 11th, 12th and 13th Infantry Division, the USAFIP-NL 11th Infantry Regiment of the Philippine Commonwealth Army, and the 1st Regiment of the Philippine Constabulary liberated and recaptured the town of Jones from the Japanese forces. The liberating forces united the scattered guerrilla units who helped in attacking and defeating the Japanese Imperial Army forces toward the end of the war.

Jones is the home of Silvino M. Gumpal who ably led the Isabela as provincial governor from 1946 to 1951; earlier, Gumpal represented Isabela in Congress from 1934 to 1935.

[In 1959, the name of barrio Mangaratungot was changed to San Vicente.]

Jones has two new steel bridges worth P300 M -- the Dalibubon bridge, now known as Jones I Bridge, which serves as the northern boundary gate between Jones and Echague, and the Embarcadero bridge, now known as Jones II Bridge, which leads to San Agustin, the southeastern-most town of Isabela.

Geography

Barangays 
Jones is politically subdivided into 42 barangays. These barangays are headed by elected officials: a Barangay Captain, and a Barangay Council whose members are called Barangay Councilors. All are elected every three years.

[Barangay Dicamay 2 is situated in the forest region, 35 kilometres away from Jones poblacion. There are more or less 700 family heads of inhabitants in the barangay and they are classified into four ethnic groups which are the Ilokos, Ifugaos, Igorots and Gaddangs. Agricultural products such as corn, cassava, banana and rice are the source of income of the Dicamay people.]

The barangays are:
 Abulan
 Addalam
 Arubub
 Bannawag
 Bantay
 Barangay I (Poblacion - Centro)
 Barangay II (Poblacion - Centro)
 Barangcuag
 Dalibubon
 Daligan
 Diarao
 Dibuluan
 Dicamay I
 Dicamay II
 Dipangit
 Disimpit
 Divinan
 Dumawing
 Fugu
 Lacab
 Linamanan
 Linomot
 Malannit
 Minuri
 Namnama
 Napaliong
 Palagao
 Papan Este
 Papan Weste
 Payac
 Pungpongan
 San Antonio
 San Isidro
 San Jose
 San Roque
 San Sebastian
 San Vicente
 Santa Isabel
 Santo Domingo
 Tupax
 Usol
 Villa Bello

Climate

Demographics

There was originally a population of Agta [Pugot/Aeta] living in the vicinity of Jones, along the Dicamay River. The Agta are one of the many groups known as 'Negritos' and who are descended from the pre-Austronesian population of the islands. The Dicamay Agta, who combined hunter-gathering with swidden agriculture, have been severely impacted by the influx of other ethnic groups who took up hillside and farm lands, resulting in there being no Agta living in the area today. There are numerous reports of the Agta having been driven off their lands, and in some cases of having been killed by immigrant groups of farmers.

Languages
Jones is dominantly using these languages: Iloko, Yogad, Bugkalot/Ilongot, Dicamay Agta. English, being one of the official languages is used primarily in communication for government publications, local newsprints, road signs, commercial signs and in doing official business transactions. Tagalog, another official language and is also considered the national language is used as verbal communication channel among residents.

Economy 

Jones is primarily an agricultural municipality best suited for the intensive production of rice and corn as evidence by its topographic map which shows that 73% of the agricultural area of 16,848 hectares is under 0-3 slope category.

Culture 
Pinilisa Festival

The Pinilisa Festival is an acknowledgment of the culture of Jonesians and celebrated every March 17 to rejoice over the bountiful harvests of Pinilisa, a unique organic plum-colored rice known not only in the region but also in other countries, due to its unique fragrance and flavor compared to ordinary rice. Unlike other varieties that rely on synthetic commercial fertilizer to grow healthy, this rare rice variety can thrive on rainwater and the rich alluvial soil in the area. Its gustatory features make it a favorite staple food and primary ingredient for native rice cakes and other products.

The success of the first Pinilisa Festival was conceptualized by the initiative of the administration of Florante A. Raspado, its first festival director-general.  The festival was easily produced and marked the history of the town of Jones and one among the line-up of the Department of Tourism Wow! Philippines Program, making Pinilisa Festival is recognized not only in the Philippines but as well as on the world. The famous product “Pinilsa Rice” of Jones has given birth to the now famous Pinilisa Festival of Jones and is now identified and included in the list and calendar of the famous festival in the country maintained and documented by the Department of Tourism. Tourism Regional Director Blessida G. Diwa is among the patrons of the Pinilisa Festival, showing consistent support for the promotion of the Festival.

Saba Festival
Dicamay people also celebrates the Banana “Saba” festival in the month of May. In this month people choose a day where they gather to the Barangay center for celebration, “Thanksgiving mass” is held in the morning and other activities in the evening where each purok/zone members shall have presentations for people enjoyment.

Tourism 
Sibsib falls is the known tourist spot in Dicamay 2 which is 4 km from the barangay proper. It is a great place for bonding. Many visitors from other towns and barangays enjoy the beauty and freshness of air and water in the falls.

Infrastructure 
The municipality is 354 kilometres north from Metro Manila and about 116 kilometres from Ilagan City, the province's capital, 45 kilometres from Santiago, Isabela and 17 kilometers from a junction at Barangay Ipil in the municipality of Echague.

GV Florida Transport is the one of the biggest bus transportation in Northern Philippines particularly Cagayan Valley was currently serving the town & that serves Executive Deluxe Buses (with restroom) - (Jones, Isabela - Sampaloc, Manila via TPLEX

Accessible with UV Express Vans from Santiago to San Agustin.

Government

Local government
The municipality is governed by a mayor designated as its local chief executive and by a municipal council as its legislative body in accordance with the Local Government Code. The mayor, vice mayor, and the councilors are elected directly by the people through an election which is being held every three years.

Elected officials

Congress representation
Jones, belonging to the fourth legislative district of the province of Isabela, currently represented by Hon. Alyssa Sheena P. Tan.

Education
The Schools Division of Isabela governs the town's public education system. The division office is a field office of the DepEd in Cagayan Valley region. The office governs the public and private elementary and public and private high schools throughout the municipality.

References

External links
Municipal Profile at the National Competitiveness Council of the Philippines
Jones at the Isabela Government Website
Local Governance Performance Management System
[ Philippine Standard Geographic Code]
Philippine Census Information
Municipality of Jones

Municipalities of Isabela (province)
Populated places on the Rio Grande de Cagayan